Parshakova is a rural locality (a village) in Yorgvinskoye Rural Settlement, Kudymkarsky District, Perm Krai, Russia. The population was 26 as of 2010.

Geography 
Parshakova is located 27 km north of Kudymkar (the district's administrative centre) by road. Molova is the nearest rural locality.

References 

Rural localities in Kudymkarsky District